Burhi Aair Sadhu or Burhi Aai'r Xaadhu (literally translated to Grand Mother's Tales) is a collection of stories or folklore, that have been compiled by famous Assamese author and poet Lakshminath Bezbaruah. It is one of the most popular texts in Assamese literature. This book was first published in October–November 1911. After the first publication 100 years have been passed and countless editions of the book have been published.  This book is in now in the public domain as per copyright law of India.

Book description
Some of the 30 folklores included in the book were his own. The preface itself was a brilliant narration regarding genesis, movement and importance of folklores in different societies and communities of the world. Some of the stories are Bandor aaru Xial, Dhowa Kauri aru Tiposi Sorai, Budhiyak Xial, Gongatop, Tejimola, Xorobjan and Burha Burhi.

List of stories

 Bandor aru Xial (বান্দৰ আৰু শিয়াল)
 Dhura Kauri aru Tiposi Sorai
 Mekurir Jiyekor Xadhu
 Dighalthengia
 Budhiyok Xial
 Bagh aru Kekura
 Tejimola
 Burha-Buri aru Xial
 Gangatup
 Xorobjan
 Silonir Jiyekor Xadhu
 Eta Boli Manuh
 Kukurikona
 Tula aru Teja
 Kotajuwa Naak Kharoni di Dhak
 Bhekulir Xadhu
 Tawoiekor Xadhu
 Lotkon
 Lokhimi Tiruta
 Dui Budhiyok
 Kanchani
 Ou Kuwori(ঔ-কুঁৱৰী)
 Ejoni Malini aru Ejupa Phool
 Numoliya Pu
 Eta Xingora Maasor Kotha
 Tikhor Aru Suti Bai
 Champavati
 Jaradgab Rojar Upokhyan
 Panexoi
 Juwair Xadhu

Source of stories
The author collected these stories from the common native people of Assam and then prepared this book. The names he mentioned in the preface of the book who contributed the folklores (but without explicitly mentioning who contributed which one) were Bhramarendra Saikia, Mahi Chandra Bora, Sitanath Sharma, Sarveshwar Sharma Kotoky, Rudrakanta Goswami, Wajed Ali, Naranath Sharma, Rusheswar Sharma, Padmadhar Chaliha, Ratnakanta Sharma, Haladhar Bhuyan, Guluk Chandra Sharma, Meghnath Deka, Roop Chandra Barua, Dinanath Medhi, Lokonath Das, Gobinda Chandra Choudhuri, and Dineswar Dutta.

English translation
This book was translated to English as "Old Mother's Wise Tales" by Nripen Dutta Baruah and published by LBS Publications,
India.

Modern uses and adaptations
The stories have been notably adapted for screen, stage, and television over the years.

Films
 An Assamese film, Haladhar (1991), was made from a story of this book by Sanjeev Hazorika.
 Another Assamese movie, Tula aru Teja, directed by Junmoni Devi Khaund and released on 13 April 2012 is based on the story of this book of the same name.
 In 2013, Metanormal Motion Pictures announced a new project inspired by four stories contained in Burhi Aair Sadhu. Titled Kothanodi, the film was expected to release in 2015. The four stories referenced in the film are Tejimola, Champawati, Ou Kuwori (The Outenga Maiden) and Tawoir Xadhu (The Story of Tawoi).

References

External links

 Lakshminath Bezbaruah at OnlineSivasagar.com
 Audio links
 
 গল্প সাধুকথা কবিতা জীৱনী at assamesestories.in

  Colours of a folk tale - Mridul Sarma reinterprets the story in her novel Tejimalar Makar Sadhu.
 Gather Around Grandma, Screen — The Indian Express.
 6 times 6 translates into 180, all children's stories Screen — The Indian Express.
 Burhi Aair Saadhu ebook at AssamKart - North East India's only ebookstore

 গল্প সাধুকথা কবিতা জীৱনী at assamesestories.in

Assamese literature
Books from Assam
Assamese-language books
1911 books
Public domain books
20th-century Indian books
Indian folklore
Indian fairy tales
Indian literature
Indian intellectual property law